Eugen Madisoo (1886-1954) was an Estonian politician. He was a member of VI Riigikogu, being Secretary-General of the Chamber of Deputies.

References

1886 births
1954 deaths
Members of the Riigivolikogu